Lucy J. Sprague (born Earle 1851 – September 29, 1903) was an American suffragist from Rochester, New York.

Biography 

Sprague was born as Lucy Earle in Rochester, New York, in 1851. Her family were involved in the African Methodist Episcopal Zion Church and Sprague would remain active throughout her life. She was married to James Alfred Sprague in 1878 and they had one surviving son.

In the church, Sprague volunteered in several different roles, including acting as treasurer and superintendent of the Sunday School for infants. She and her husband were both  members of the Susan B. Anthony Club for Colored Women and worked towards women's suffrage. Sprague also worked with Hester C. Jeffrey in the church and as an activist.

Sprague died on September 29, 1903, in her home in Rochester. She was buried in Mount Hope Cemetery.

References 

1851 births
1903 deaths
People from Rochester, New York
African-American suffragists
American suffragists
19th-century African-American people
19th-century African-American women
20th-century African-American people
20th-century African-American women